Ciclopirox (sometimes known by the abbreviation CPX) is a synthetic antifungal agent for topical dermatologic treatment of superficial mycoses. It is most useful against tinea versicolor. It is sold under many brand names worldwide.

Medical uses
Ciclopirox is indicated for the treatment of tinea pedis and tinea corporis due to Trichophyton rubrum, Trichophyton mentagrophytes and Epidermophyton floccosum, as well as seborrheic dermatitis. It is not to be used in the eyes or vagina, and nursing women should consult their doctors before use, since it is not known whether ciclopirox passes into human milk. A burning sensation may be felt when first applying ciclopirox on the skin.

Nail infections
In addition to other formulations, ciclopirox is used in lacquers for topical treatment of onychomycosis (fungal infections of the nails). A meta-analysis of the six trials of nail infections available in 2009 concluded that they provided evidence that topical ciclopirox had poor cure rates, and that amorolfine might be substantially more effective, but more research was required. "Combining data from 2 trials of ciclopiroxolamine versus placebo found treatments failure rates of 61% and 64% for ciclopiroxolamine. These outcomes followed long treatment times (48 weeks) and this makes ciclopiroxolamine a poor choice for nail infections. Better results were observed with the use of amorolfine lacquer; 6% treatment failure rates were found after 1 month of treatment but these data were collected on a very small sample of people and these high rates of success might be unreliable."

Efinaconazole, an azole antifungal, led to cure rates two or three times better than the next-best topical treatment, ciclopirox.

Pharmacology

Pharmacodynamics
In contrast to the azoles and other antimycotic drugs, the mechanism of action of ciclopirox is poorly understood. However, loss of function of certain catalase and peroxidase enzymes has been implicated as the mechanism of action, as well as various other components of cellular metabolism. In a study conducted to further elucidate ciclopirox's mechanism, several Saccharomyces cerevisiae mutants were screened and tested. Results from interpretation of the effects of both the drug treatment and mutation suggested that ciclopirox may exert its effect by disrupting DNA repair, cell division signals and structures (mitotic spindles) as well as some elements of intracellular transport.

It was in 2007 currently being investigated as an alternative treatment to ketoconazole for seborrhoeic dermatitis as it suppresses growth of the yeast Malassezia furfur. Initial results showed similar efficacy to ketoconazole with a relative increase in subjective symptom relief due to its inherent anti-inflammatory properties.

Chemistry
Ciclopirox is a N-hydroxypyridone. Structurally, ciclopirox is the N-oxide of a 2-hydroxypyridine derivative and therefore can be termed a hydroxypyridine antifungal agent. Additionally, the structure as drawn above is the lactam tautomer and indicates the molecule being an N-hydroxy-2-pyridone. Hence the classification of ciclopirox as a 2-pyridone antifungal agent.

Ciclopirox is used clinically as ciclopirox olamine, the olamine salt of ciclopirox.

References

2-Pyridones
Antifungals
Cyclohexyl compounds